is one of the eight wards of the city of Hiroshima, Japan.
As of March 1, 2012, the ward had an estimated population of 138,471, with 66,706 households and a population density of 5,307.44 persons per km². The total area was 26.09 km².

Wards of Hiroshima